is a Japanese retired footballer who played for Cerezo Osaka.

Career
Fujimoto played his entire professional career with Cerezo Osaka. He retired from football at the end of the 2019 season.

Career statistics
Updated to 25 February 2019.

Reserves performance

Last Updated: 25 February 2019

References

External links
Profile at Cerezo Osaka

1986 births
Living people
Association football people from Kumamoto Prefecture
Japanese footballers
J1 League players
J2 League players
J3 League players
Cerezo Osaka players
Cerezo Osaka U-23 players
Association football defenders